Saint-Hymetière is a former commune in the Jura department in the Bourgogne-Franche-Comté region in eastern France. On 1 January 2019, it was merged into the new commune Saint-Hymetière-sur-Valouse.

Population

See also
Communes of the Jura department

References

Former communes of Jura (department)